Zötler or Privat-Brauerei Zötler is a traditional brewery in Rettenberg, Allgäu, Germany with the annual production about 45,000 hectoliters.

The history is traced back to a brewery founded in 1447, at the foot of the Grünten.

On 10 August 2009 the brewery took over the brand rights and customers of the "Postbrauerei Karl Meyer Nesselwang" with the purchase contract as of 1 December 2009.

Zötler produces various styles, including 1447 Naturtrüb, Zötler Gold, Privat-Pils, Hefeweizen Light and Dark, Hefeweizen leicht, St. Stephansbock, Korbinian Dunkel, Festbier, Maibock, Vollmond-Bier, etc. Zötler also produces soft drinks of the Libella brand.

Zötler is part of the initiative "Die Freien Brauer", founded in 2006, an association of independent private breweries in Europe.

See also 
List of oldest companies

References 

Article uses the text from Privat-Brauerei Zötler on German Wikipedia retrieved on 24 February 2017.

External links 
Homepage in German

1447 establishments in Europe
15th-century establishments in the Holy Roman Empire
Beer brands of Germany
Breweries in Germany
Food and drink companies established in the 15th century
Pages translated from German Wikipedia